For the company, see Stefanini IT Solutions.

Stefanini is an Italian surname. Notable people with the surname include:

Antonietta Stefanini, best known as Antonella Steni (1926–2016), Italian actress, voice actress, comedian and presenter
Lucrezia Stefanini (born 1998), Italian tennis player
Luigi Stefanini (1891-1956), Italian philosopher
Matteo Stefanini (born 1984), Italian rower
Rafe Stefanini (born 1950s), Italian banjo player and guitarist

Italian-language surnames
Patronymic surnames
Surnames from given names